Glan-Münchweiler is a former Verbandsgemeinde ("collective municipality") in the district of Kusel, Rhineland-Palatinate, Germany. On 1 January 2017 it merged into the new Verbandsgemeinde Oberes Glantal. The seat of the Verbandsgemeinde was in Glan-Münchweiler.

The Verbandsgemeinde Glan-Münchweiler consisted of the following Ortsgemeinden ("local municipalities"):

 Börsborn
 Glan-Münchweiler
 Henschtal
 Herschweiler-Pettersheim
 Hüffler
 Krottelbach
 Langenbach
 Matzenbach
 Nanzdietschweiler
 Quirnbach
 Rehweiler
 Steinbach am Glan
 Wahnwegen

Former Verbandsgemeinden in Rhineland-Palatinate